Glasgow City Football Club is a women's football team based in Glasgow that plays in SWPL 1, the top division of women's football in Scotland and also the higher of two levels of the Scottish Women's Premier League. The club has competed in the UEFA Women's Cup and UEFA Women's Champions League. They also have a reserve team and youth teams.

Glasgow City has won the most Premier League titles and the most Scottish Cups in Scotland since 2000.

In 2016, Glasgow City won their tenth Scottish Women's Premier League title in a row, a Scottish record surpassing the previous record of nine achieved by the men's teams of Celtic and Rangers. However they lost their four-year monopoly on the domestic trophies with Hibernian L.F.C. winning the SWPL Cup and Scottish Cup.
By 2021, they had won 14 SWPL titles in a row.

History
Glasgow City Football Club was formed in 1998 by Laura Montgomery and Carol Anne Stewart. They play in orange and black. The club play their home matches at Petershill Park in the Springburn district in the north of Glasgow, although from 2014 to 2017 they played at the larger Excelsior Stadium in Airdrie, 
around 15 miles outside the city, due to issues with the artificial playing surface at Petershill. For the 2020–21 season, with Petershill unavailable, they played at Broadwood Stadium in Cumbernauld, North Lanarkshire.

City completed a domestic clean sweep in 2012, winning the treble, and they completed a second consecutive domestic treble in 2013. Between the seasons 2009 and 2018 inclusive, Glasgow City lost only three League matches, and continued an unprecedented run of successive Scottish championships that began in 2007–08 It was reported Glasgow City had held talks with the FA WSL in February 2013 about a possible move to an extended top flight in England. City cited football was not moving forward quickly enough in Scotland for women to match their ambition. The FA shut the door on any potential move. City general manager Laura Montgomery later reiterated the club's desire to play in the FA WSL.

During the 2014 season, Glasgow City secured an eighth successive SWPL title and third successive treble. After a superb 5–4 aggregate win against FC Zurich, City became the first Scottish team to reach the UEFA Women's Champions League quarter-finals in November 2014. After a 2–1 first leg defeat at FC Zurich, City were 1–0 down at half time, with their keeper substituted due a suspected broken collar bone, in the second leg. Despite City replying with two early second half goals, Zurich made it 2–2. An 81st minute Jo Love strike leveled the tie, but with City heading out of the competition on away goals, Suzanne Lappin powered home a header a few minutes from time to send them through. In the quarter-finals, Paris Saint-Germain proved too strong for City, with a 7–0 aggregate victory.

City were seeded for the UEFA Women's Champions League in 2015–16, as they entered straight in to the round of 32, both for the very first time. As the eighth seeds, the team will face Chelsea.

In July 2015, Eddie Wolecki stepped down as Glasgow City manager after four and a half years in charge, with Scott Booth announced as his replacement.

City reached the Champions League quarter-finals for the second time in 2019–20; they were the last independent women's football club to achieve this. In the 2020–21 Scottish Women's Premier League, they won their fourteenth title in succession. Following the departure of Scott Booth in summer 2021 to take head coach role at Birmingham City W.F.C., Grant Scott was appointed as interim head coach until Eileen Gleeson was freed from her commitments as assistant coach with Republic of Ireland women's national team and could take up post as head coach in November 2021.

Club records

 Record win: 29–0 against FC Kilmarnock, May 2010.
 Record defeat: 0–10 against Turbine Potsdam in the UEFA Women's Champions League, 2 November 2011.
 Most goals in all competitions: Leanne Ross, 250.
 Most league goals in a season: Leanne Ross, 42 (during the 2010 season).
 Most goals in a season: Leanne Ross, 54 (during the 2010 season).
 Most goals in a game: Debbie McWhinnie, 12 against Motherwell in the Scottish Women's Cup, February 2004.
 Highest European home attendance: 1,785 against Paris Saint-Germain, 22 March 2015.

Honours
 Scottish Women's Premier League
Winners (15): 2004–05, 2007–08, 2008–09, 2009, 2010, 2011, 2012, 2013, 2014, 2015, 2016, 2017, 2018, 2019, 2020–21
 Scottish Women's Cup
Winners (9): 2004, 2006, 2009, 2011, 2012, 2013, 2014, 2015, 2019
 Scottish Women's Premier League Cup
Winners (6): 2008–09, 2009, 2012, 2013, 2014, 2015
 Scottish Women's Football First Division
Winners (1): 1998–99

Other tournaments
 National 5-A-Side
Winners (2): 1999–00, 2000–01
 Umbro Cup (Manchester)
 Winners (2): 2007, 2009 (shared)
 Reebok Trophy (Mansfield)
 Winners (1): 1999

Awards
 Scottish Sports Awards Amateur Performance of the Year: 2011
 GCC Glasgow Team of the Year: 2008, 2011, 2013, 2014
 Glaswegian Team of the Year: 2009
 Sports Council of Glasgow Performance Team of the Year: 2010

European history 
Glasgow City has participated in several seasons of UEFA competitions; reaching the second qualifying round of the Women's Cup (last 16) in the 2008–09 season. In the 2011–12 UEFA Women's Champions League they won their qualifying group and moved on to the round of 32. They then defeated Icelandic team Valur to become the first Scottish side to reach the round of 16 of the Champions League. 
The Round of 16 ended in "humiliating" fashion for Glasgow City, where against German champions Turbine Potsdam, they lost the tie 17–0 on aggregate. The 10–0 first leg defeat in Potsdam is the only time any team in the knockout stages of the champions league has been beaten by double figures. In 2013–14 they reached the round of 16 again, losing 2–6 against Arsenal on aggregate.

In 2014 they became the first Scottish team to advance to the quarterfinals, and achieved the feat again in 2020, but lost 9–1 to Wolfsburg (twice previous winners and runners-up twice more) in a single-game tie played in San Sebastián due to the COVID-19 pandemic in Europe.

Current squad

Former players
For details of former players, see :Category:Glasgow City F.C. players.

Current technical staff
As of 3 June 2022

Other Staff

Player of the year

 2021/22 - Jenna Clark
 2020/21 - Priscila Chinchilla / Janine Van Wyk
 2019 - Kirsty Howat
 2018 - Leanne Crichton 
 2017 - Abbi Grant
 2016 - Erin Cuthbert
 2015 - Denise O'Sullivan
 2014 - Denise O'Sullivan
 2013 - Suzanne Lappin
 2012 - Jane Ross
2011 - Clare Gemmell
2010 - Suzanne Lappin
2009 - Katharina Lindner
2008 - Megan Sneddon
2007 - Jane Ross
2006 - Katharina Lindner
2005 - Jayne Sommerville
2004 - Suzanne Lappin
2003 - Debbie McWhinnie
2002 - Pauline McVey
2001 - Laura Montgomery
2000 - Susan Maxwell & Laura MacDonald (Shared)
1999 - Kirsten Abercrombie & Fiona Laird (Shared)

Former managers

 Kathleen O'Donnell: 1998–1999
 Peter Caulfield: 1999–2010
 Eddie Wolecki Black: 2011–2015
 Scott Booth: 2015–2021
 Grant Scott: 2021 (Interim)
 Eileen Gleeson: 2021-2022

References

External links
 
 
 Glasgow City at the SWPL official website
UEFA profile

 
Women's football clubs in Scotland
Association football clubs established in 1998
Football clubs in Glasgow
1998 establishments in Scotland
Football in North Lanarkshire
Scottish Women's Premier League clubs
Springburn